The South Central Colorado Urban Area comprises the Colorado Springs Metropolitan Statistical Area, the Pueblo Metropolitan Statistical Area, and the Cañon City Micropolitan Statistical Area in the central and south central region of the State of Colorado.  With the exception of northern Teller County and small portions of northern El Paso County, the entire South Central Colorado Urban Area is drained by the Arkansas River and its tributaries.  The South Central Colorado Urban Area is the southernmost of the three primary subregions of the Front Range Urban Corridor.

The South Central Colorado Urban Area had a population of 851,500 at the 2010 United States Census, and increase of 17.43% from the 2000 United States Census.  In 2010, 16.93% of Coloradans lived in the South Central Colorado Urban Area.

Extent

Municipalities

Constituent jurisdictions

The South Central Colorado Urban Area includes

Places over 100,000 inhabitants
 Colorado Springs
 Pueblo

Places with 10,000 to 100,000 inhabitants
 Cañon City
 Fountain

Places with 1,000 to 10,000 inhabitants
 Cripple Creek
 Florence
 Manitou Springs
 Monument
 Palmer Lake
 Woodland Park

Places with less than 1,000 inhabitants
 Brookside
 Boone
 Calhan
 Coal Creek
 Green Mountain Falls
 Ramah
 Rockvale
 Rye
 Williamsburg
 Victor

and-

 unincorporated El Paso County
 unincorporated Fremont County 
 unincorporated Pueblo County 
 unincorporated Teller County, Colorado.

See also

Colorado
Outline of Colorado
Index of Colorado-related articles
Bibliography of Colorado
Colorado statistical areas
Front Range Urban Corridor
North Central Colorado Urban Area
South Central Colorado Urban Area
Geography of Colorado
History of Colorado
List of counties in Colorado
List of places in Colorado
List of census-designated places in Colorado
List of forts in Colorado
List of ghost towns in Colorado
List of mountain passes in Colorado
List of mountain peaks of Colorado
List of municipalities in Colorado
List of adjectivals and demonyms for Colorado cities
List of city nicknames in Colorado
List of post offices in Colorado
Protected areas of Colorado

References

External links

Colorado state government website
Colorado tourism website
History Colorado website

Metropolitan areas of Colorado